Thaumetopoea solitaria is a moth of the subfamily Thaumetopoeinae in the family Notodontidae first described by Christian Friedrich Freyer in 1838. It is found in Anatolia (including Turkey), on Cyprus, east to Syria, Israel, Lebanon, Iraq and Iran.

The wingspan is 20–28 mm for males and 25–35 mm for females. The moths are on wing from August to September.

The larvae feed on Pistacia terebinthus, Cupressus sempervirens and Fraxinus.

Sources 
 P.C.-Rougeot, P. Viette (1978). Guide des papillons nocturnes d'Europe et d'Afrique du Nord. Delachaux et Niestlé (Lausanne).

Thaumetopoeinae
Moths of Europe
Moths of Asia
Moths described in 1838